Palpita approximalis is a moth in the family Crambidae. It is found in Papua New Guinea.

References

Moths described in 1918
Palpita
Moths of New Guinea